Sir Francis Anderson  (21 December 1614 – 19 July 1679) was an English Royalist landowner and politician who represented Newcastle-upon-Tyne once as Sheriff, twice as Mayor and as MP in the House of Commons between 1660 and 1679.

Early life

Anderson was the only son of Roger Anderson (d.1622) of Jesmond, Newcastle-upon-Tyne and his wife, Anne Jackson, the daughter of William Bower alias Jackson, of Newcastle-upon-Tyne and Oxen-le-Field, County Durham.

Roger Anderson was Sheriff of Newcastle-upon-Tyne (1612–13) and was one of the seven sons of Francis Anderson (d.1623). Francis the Elder had been Sheriff (1595–6) and Mayor (1601–2, 1612–13) of Newcastle-upon-Tyne and was a distant cousin of the Royalist Sir Henry Anderson. Francis Anderson the Younger was educated at Corpus Christi College, Oxford and Gray's Inn.

Career
Anderson was Sheriff (1641–42) and Alderman of Newcastle-upon-Tyne (1642–44 and 1662–79) and was knighted in November 1641. During the Civil War, he "was a devoted loyalist" and as a result was subsequently fined £1,200, stripped of his knighthood, imprisoned and had his property sequestered.

In 1660, Anderson was elected member of parliament for Newcastle-upon-Tyne in the Convention Parliament. He was re-elected MP for Newcastle-upon-Tyne for the Cavalier Parliament (1661) and sat until his death. He was a justice of the peace for County Durham (1660–79) and Mayor of Newcastle-upon-Tyne (1662–63 and 1675–76).

Anderson lived at Greyfriars House, Newcastle-upon-Tyne, in Jesmond, and Ryton, County Durham. He was buried at Ryton on 19 July 1679.

Family
In 1636, Anderson married Jane Dent (d. 1673), daughter of John Dent of Barnard Castle, County Durham, and they had seven sons (John, Henry, George, Robert, Francis, Thomas and Roger) and three daughters.

Arms

Ancestry

References

1614 births
1679 deaths
Anderson family of Newcastle-upon-Tyne
Politicians from Newcastle upon Tyne
English MPs 1660
English MPs 1661–1679
Mayors of Newcastle upon Tyne